Mott Bridge is a historic timber braced spandrel arch bridge over the North Umpqua River in Douglas County, Oregon, United States. The bridge provides access from Oregon Route 138 to the Mott Trailhead on the North Umpqua Trail. 

Constructed from 1935 to 1936 by the Civilian Conservation Corps, the bridge is the only surviving example of three such structures built during the Great Depression in the Pacific Northwest.

The bridge is named after Lawrence Mott (1881-1931), who had a nearby fishing camp by the junction of Steamboat Creek and the North Umpqua River. Prior to the opening of the bridge, guests arriving from the north side of the river rang a bell to call for someone in the camp to row them and their baggage across the river.

Mott Bridge has been designated as an Oregon Historic Civil Engineering Landmark by the American Society of Civil Engineers.

References

 Bridges completed in 1936
 Bridges in Douglas County, Oregon
 Historic Civil Engineering Landmarks
 Road bridges in Oregon
 Tourist attractions in Douglas County, Oregon
 Wooden bridges in Oregon